Tegeticula baccatella is a moth of the family Prodoxidae. It is found in the United States in Arizona and New Mexico and adjacent regions of California, Nevada, Utah and Colorado. It is also found in western Texas (up to Presidio County). The habitat consists of shrub desert, rocky hillsides and open pine forests with outcrops.

The wingspan is 19.5–28 mm. The forewings are white or sometimes tan colored. The hindwings are dark brownish gray.

The larvae feed on Yucca baccata, Yucca thornberi and Yucca confinis. They feed on developing seeds. Pupation takes place in a cocoon in the soil.

References

Moths described in 1999
Prodoxidae